Cryptocephalomorpha is a genus of beetles in the family Carabidae, containing the following species:

 Cryptocephalomorpha australica Baehr, 1997
 Cryptocephalomorpha collaris (C.O. Waterhouse, 1877)
 Cryptocephalomorpha gaverei Ritsema, 1875
 Cryptocephalomorpha genieri Baehr, 1997
 Cryptocephalomorpha gigantea Baehr, 2002
 Cryptocephalomorpha major Baehr, 1997
 Cryptocephalomorpha maxima Baehr, 2009
 Cryptocephalomorpha papua Darlington, 1968

One of the characteristics of the genus Cryptocephalomorpha is that the labrum is not visible but hidden under the head.

References

Pseudomorphinae